George Leavens Lilley (August 3, 1859 – April 21, 1909) was an American politician serving as a United States representative and the 63rd governor of Connecticut.

Biography
Born in Oxford, Massachusetts, Lilley was the son of John Leavens Lilley and Caroline W. (Adams) Lilley. He attended the common schools of Oxford, the Worcester High School, and Worcester Technical Institute. He moved to Waterbury, Connecticut, in 1881 and engaged in mercantile pursuits and the real estate business. He married Anna E. H. Steele on June 17, 1884. The couple had three sons, Frederick, John, and Theodore.

Career
A member of Connecticut Republican State Committee from 1901 to 1909, Lilley also served in the Connecticut House of Representatives from 1901 to 1903.

Lilley was elected as a Republican to the Fifty-eighth, Fifty-ninth, and Sixtieth Congresses, holding office from March 4, 1903, to January 5, 1909.  He did not seek renomination in 1908, having become a candidate for Governor. By resolution of the House of January 20, 1909, the seat was declared to have been vacated on January 6, 1909, for the reason that incumbent had entered upon the duties of the office of Governor of Connecticut the preceding day, however this only occurred because Lilley submitted his letter of resignation to the Governor of Connecticut instead of the Speaker of the House.

Lilley won the 1908 Republican gubernatorial nomination, and was elected Governor of Connecticut. During his short tenure, he increased funding for the public school system and appropriations were budgeted for a statewide movement against tuberculosis. He also endorsed governing monopolies and establishing a public service commission, but both issues were defeated by the legislature.

Death
Lilley was Governor of Connecticut from January 6, 1909, until his death on April 21, 1909, in Hartford; he was interred at Riverside Cemetery, Waterbury, Connecticut. He was a member of the Union League.

References

External links

The Political Graveyard
Govtrack US Congress

1859 births
1909 deaths
Burials at Riverside Cemetery (Waterbury, Connecticut)
Republican Party governors of Connecticut
Republican Party members of the Connecticut House of Representatives
Politicians from Hartford, Connecticut
Politicians from Waterbury, Connecticut
People from Oxford, Massachusetts
American Congregationalists
Republican Party members of the United States House of Representatives from Connecticut
19th-century American politicians